Lloyd Bertram (10 October 1903 – 12 April 1971) was an Australian rules footballer who played with Essendon in the Victorian Football League (VFL).

Notes

External links 		
		
		
		
		
		

1903 births
1971 deaths
Australian rules footballers from Victoria (Australia)
Essendon Football Club players